IGPA may refer to: 

 The Internet Gambling Prohibition Act, a 1999 bill in the US Senate to ban Internet gambling.
 Indice Global de Precios de Acciones a Chilean stock index.